Getta is a genus of moths of the family Notodontidae. It consists of the following species:
Getta baetifica (Druce, 1898)
Getta ennia Druce, 1899
Getta niveifascia Walker, 1864
Getta tica J.S. Miller, 2009
Getta turrenti J.S. Miller, 2009
Getta unicolor (Hering, 1925)

Notodontidae of South America